Perry Township is one of the fifteen townships of Pickaway County, Ohio, United States.  The 2000 census found 1,319 people in the township, 626 of whom lived in the unincorporated portions of the township.

Geography
Located in the southwestern corner of the county, it borders the following townships:
Monroe Township - north
Deer Creek Township - east
Deerfield Township, Ross County - south
Wayne Township, Fayette County - southwest corner
Marion Township, Fayette County - west
Madison Township, Fayette County - northwest

Part of the village of New Holland is located in western Perry Township.

Name and history
It is one of twenty-six Perry Townships statewide.

Government
The township is governed by a three-member board of trustees, who are elected in November of odd-numbered years to a four-year term beginning on the following January 1. Two are elected in the year after the presidential election and one is elected in the year before it. There is also an elected township fiscal officer, who serves a four-year term beginning on April 1 of the year after the election, which is held in November of the year before the presidential election. Vacancies in the fiscal officership or on the board of trustees are filled by the remaining trustees.

References

External links
County website

Townships in Pickaway County, Ohio
Townships in Ohio